Azerbaijani National Encyclopedia is a universal encyclopedic book written in Azerbaijani language and published in 2010. The main building of publisher is situated in Old City (Icheri Sheher), Boyuk Qala street.

Historical overview 
The initial attempt for publishing the Azerbaijani encyclopedia was in the early years of the 20th century but was not published at that time. The decree for Publication of Azerbaijani Soviet Encyclopedia was signed on December 30, 1965, and the first volume was published  in 1970, but publication was suspended because of  non-compliance with the Soviet regulations. In accordance with the order in 1975, the encyclopedia was restored again. During the years of 1976-1987, the publication of a new version  of the encyclopedia was completed, replacing the previous version .

After   independence, there was signed a decree for publication of Azerbaijan national encyclopedia dated  30 May 2000. On 5 May 2004, a presidential decree was signed for  the establishment of the Research Center of Azerbaijani National Encyclopedia in order to ensure the preparation and publication of the encyclopedia.  The  encyclopedia was published by the Research Center under the Azerbaijan National Academy of Sciences. The first 25 thousand copies were published by Sherg-Gerb publishers and delivered to the libraries and other organizations free of charge.

In 2007, a  special volume called “Azerbaijan” was published. Furthermore, the first volume of the Azerbaijan national encyclopedia was published in 2009. There is intended to publish total 20 volumes of the encyclopedia and each volume contains 800-900 pages. Each volume of encyclopedia will be issued in an edition of thirty thousand copies.

Editions

Russian version 
Russian version of Azerbaijani national encyclopedia was published in an edition of five thousand copies. It is general collection about Azerbaijan, which contains information about history, culture, literature, science and education of the country.  

In 2012 special volume in Russian was published in Germany.

Other editions 

 Azərbaycan // Azerbaijani National Encyclopedia — .
 A – Argelander // Azerbaijani National Encyclopedia — .
 Argentina – Babilik // Azerbaijani National Encyclopedia — .
 Babilistan – Bəzirxana // Azerbaijani National Encyclopedia — .
 Bəzirxana – Brünel // Azerbaijani National Encyclopedia — .
 Büssel – Çimli-podzol torpaqlar // Azerbaijani National Encyclopedia — .
 Çin – Dərk // Azerbaijani National Encyclopedia — .

See also 

 Azerbaijani Soviet Encyclopedia

References 

Azerbaijani encyclopedias
Azerbaijani-language encyclopedias